Kamandag ng Droga is a 2017 Philippine film directed by Carlo J. Caparas. The film tackles how illegal drugs affect the lives of four teenagers.

Production
Kamandag ng Droga was directed by Carlo J. Caparas, an admitted supporter of President Rodrigo Duterte who is known for his campaign against illegal drugs and whose footage was used in the film. Carparas said that he was inspired to direct the film by his wife who requested him to work on a film that would tackle the "really rampant drug situation" in the country. Caparas and his wife said that they have seen relatives fall to drug addiction.

Filming of Kamandag ng Droga was finished in late 2016 but editing work on the film proceeded almost a year later due to the death of Caparas' wife, Donna Villa.

Caparas said that the film is not a propaganda in favor of Duterte and his anti-drug campaign. He says that the film is a "cry against drugs whose effect affects the family of those addicted to them, thus bringing a lot of damage to the entire community" and intends the film as medium to remind Filipinos that the illegal drug situation in the country could be resolved through cooperation with authorities and law enforcers.

Release
The film premiered on December 5, 2017.

Critical reception
Francis Joseph Cruz of Rappler, an editorial news website critical of Duterte was critical of Kamandag ng Droga calling it a "grand showcase of lazy filmmaking" and a propaganda. He described the characters as two-dimensional and their motivation as flimsy. He added that the film's portrayal of the country's illegal drug problem as simplistic.

References

Films about the illegal drug trade
Films directed by Carlo J. Caparas